Eksar is a small village in the Saran district of Bihar state in India. This village is inhabited by 500 families and around 2,000 people.  It is 40 km from Chhapra city. This village is knows as पंचायत राज एकसार.

The basic source of livelihood for people is farming and it is well known for rice, wheat and mango orchards. The landmarks in the village include several temples. All the temples are placed at different-different location such as Badham Baba, Hanuman Temple is situated in south of the village and Kali Temple situated in middle of the village and also a Shiv Temple in middle of the village. This village is famous for many type of old story.

References

Villages in Saran district